The Finches is an American folk pop band, founded in San Francisco, California. 

The band released their debut album Human Like a House on January 30, 2007. In February 2008, Aaron Morgan moved from The Finches. John Garmon (drums) and Gerry Saucedo (bass) joined the group. They are a trio.

Membership
Band lineup (as of May 2010):
 Cam Jones: Drums, backup vocals
 Gerry Saucedo: Bass, vocals
 Carolyn Pennypacker Riggs: Guitar, lead vocals.

Discography 
Albums
 2007 Human Like a House
 2010 On Golden Hill

EPs
 2006 Six Songs
 2009 Dear Mili

References

Sources

External links 
Official MySpace page
Official Bandcamp page

American folk musical groups